The 1975–76 QMJHL season was the seventh season in the history of the Quebec Major Junior Hockey League. The league inaugurates the Emile Bouchard Trophy to be awarded to the "Defenceman of the Year." Ten teams played 72 games each in the schedule.

The Sherbrooke Castors finished first overall in the regular season to capture the Jean Rougeau Trophy but were defeated by the Quebec Remparts in the playoff finals. It was the fifth President's Cup in seven years for Québec.

Team changes
 The Montreal Bleu Blanc Rouge are renamed the Montreal Juniors.

Final standings
Note: GP = Games played; W = Wins; L = Losses; T = Ties; PTS = Points; GF = Goals for; GA = Goals against

complete list of standings.

Scoring leaders
Note: GP = Games played; G = Goals; A = Assists; Pts = Points; PIM = Penalties in minutes

 complete scoring statistics

Playoffs
Denis Turcotte was the leading scorer of the playoffs with 26 points (9 goals, 17 assists).

Quarterfinals
 Sherbrooke Castors defeated Hull Festivals 4 games to 2.
 Cornwall Royals defeated Montreal Juniors 4 games to 2.
 Quebec Remparts defeated Sorel Éperviers 4 games to 1.
 Trois-Rivières Draveurs defeated Chicoutimi Saguenéens 4 games to 1.

Semifinals
 Sherbrooke Castors defeated Trois-Rivières Draveurs 4 games to 1.
 Quebec Remparts defeated Cornwall Royals 4 games to 0.

Finals
 Quebec Remparts defeated Sherbrooke Castors 4 games to 2.

All-star teams
East division 1st team
 Goaltender - Maurice Barrette, Quebec Remparts 
 Left defence - Jean Gagnon, Quebec Remparts
 Right defence - Daniel Poulin, Chicoutimi Saguenéens
 Left winger - Richard David, Trois-Rivières Draveurs
 Centreman - Sylvain Locas, Chicoutimi Saguenéens
 Right winger - Lucien DeBlois, Sorel Éperviers
 Coach - Ron Racette, Quebec Remparts
West division 1st team
 Goaltender - Richard Sevigny, Sherbrooke Castors 
 Left defence - Robert Picard, Montreal Juniors
 Right defence - Rick Garcia, Hull Festivals 
 Left winger - Normand Dupont, Montreal Juniors 
 Centreman - Glen Sharpley, Hull Festivals
 Right winger - Mike Bossy, Laval National & Peter Marsh, Sherbrooke Castors
 Coach - Orval Tessier, Cornwall Royals
 List of First/Second/Rookie team all-stars.

Trophies and awards
Team
President's Cup - Playoff Champions, Quebec Remparts
Jean Rougeau Trophy - Regular Season Champions, Sherbrooke Castors

Player
Michel Brière Memorial Trophy - Most Valuable Player, Peter Marsh, Sherbrooke Castors
Jean Béliveau Trophy - Top Scorer, Sylvain Locas, Chicoutimi Saguenéens & Richard Dalpe, Trois-Rivières Draveurs
Jacques Plante Memorial Trophy - Best GAA, Tim Bernhardt, Cornwall Royals
Emile Bouchard Trophy - Defenceman of the Year, Jean Gagnon, Quebec Remparts
Michel Bergeron Trophy - Rookie of the Year, Jean-Marc Bonamie, Shawinigan Dynamos
Frank J. Selke Memorial Trophy - Most sportsmanlike player, Normand Dupont, Montreal Juniors

See also
1976 Memorial Cup
1976 NHL Entry Draft
1975–76 OMJHL season
1975–76 WCHL season

References
 Official QMJHL Website
 www.hockeydb.com/

QMJHL
Quebec Major Junior Hockey League seasons